Herveld is a village in the Dutch province of Gelderland. It is located in the municipality of Overbetuwe.

Herveld was a separate municipality until 1818, when the area was divided between Loenen en Wolferen and Valburg.

The village exists of two semi-separate communities of Herveld-Noord and Herveld-Zuid., connected by the Stenenkamerstraat. The mostly Catholic Herveld-North is located directly east of the village Andelst while the more Protestant Herveld-South is a mile further south. Most amenities such as supermarkets, are located in Herveld-North.

In the center of Herveld-South is a Gothic hall church, dating from the 15th century. Just outside the village is De Vink, a mill from the 18th century. Herveld is just off the A50 motorway (junction/knooppunt Valburg), and to come into the village, one must follow the A15.
 
Herveld has a rich history of fruit cultivation.

Gallery

References

Populated places in Gelderland
Former municipalities of Gelderland
Overbetuwe